Salman Savaji (died 1376) was a Persian poet, who served as a court poet of the Jalayirids. He was born in 1309/10 in the town of Savah, located in Persian Iraq (Irāq-i Ajam), a region corresponding to the western part of Iran. He belonged to a family of accountants, who had served the viziers of the Ilkhanate. His father served under the vizier Sa'd al-Din Savaji, who was also from Savah. Salman himself received an education in the field of the divan and chancery, but had also started to distinguish himself as a poet during the reign of the last Ilkhanate ruler Abu Sa'id Bahadur Khan. He dedicated a qasida (ode) entitled Bada'i al-Ashar (or Abhar) to his patron, the vizier Ghiyath al-Din Muhammad (died 1336).

References

Sources 
 
 
 

14th-century births
1376 deaths
Jalayirid-period poets
14th-century Iranian people
People from Saveh
Ilkhanate-period poets